Marcial Maciel Degollado  (March 10, 1920 – January 30, 2008)  was a Mexican Catholic priest who founded the Legion of Christ and the Regnum Christi movement. He was general director of the Legion from 1941 to 2005. Throughout most of his career, he was respected  within the church as "the greatest fundraiser of the modern Roman Catholic church" and as a prolific recruiter of new seminarians. Late in his life, Maciel was revealed to have been a longtime drug addict who sexually abused many boys and young men in his care. After his death, it came to light that he had also maintained sexual relationships with at least four women, one of whom was a minor at the time. He fathered as many as six children, two of whom he is alleged to have sexually abused.

In 2006, Pope Benedict XVI removed Maciel from active ministry, based on the results of an investigation that he had started in his previous role as head of the Congregation for the Doctrine of the Faith before his election as Pope in April 2005. Maciel was ordered "to conduct a reserved life of prayer and penance, renouncing every public ministry". He died in 2008. On March 25, 2010, a communiqué on the Legion's website acknowledged as factual the "reprehensible actions" by Maciel, including sexual abuse of minor seminarians. In May 2010, the Vatican denounced Maciel's actions and appointed a Papal Delegate to oversee the order and its governance.

Early life and training
Maciel was born in Cotija, Michoacán, Mexico, the youngest boy of nine children, to a family with strong connections within the Catholic Church in Mexico. Numerous relatives were priests, and four of his uncles were bishops. He had a troubled youth: his father ridiculed him and encouraged his brothers to whip him. He sent the boy to work in the sugar fields to toughen him up, and years later Maciel told one of his own victims that mule drivers on his father's ranch had sexually abused him. Maciel was the grand-nephew of Bishop Rafael Guízar y Valencia, who was canonized in 2007. There has been speculation that conduct by Maciel at age 18 contributed to the death of Guizar, who had a heart attack. According to an investigative report:

The day before Bishop Guizar died, he had been heard shouting angrily at Marcial Maciel. He was giving his eighteen-year-old nephew a dressing down after two women had come to the bishop's house to complain about Maciel, who was their neighbor. Father Orozco, who was among the original group of boys to found the Legion of Christ in 1941, said he heard the women had complained about the "noise" Maciel was making with children he had brought into his home to teach religion. He said that the seminary officials blamed Maciel for his uncle's heart attack.

Maciel was expelled from two seminaries for reasons that have never been revealed, and became a priest only after one of his bishop uncles ordained him after private studies, on November 26, 1944, in Mexico City.   The ordination was filmed and the footage used in later years for marketing.

Maciel founded the Legion of Christ in 1941, with the support of Francisco González Arias, Bishop of Cuernavaca. From the beginning, he served as its general director. In 1959 Maciel founded its lay arm Regnum Christi. All Legionaries were compelled "to take private vows, never to speak ill of Maciel or any superiors, and to report to their superiors anyone who did", facilitating a "cult of personality" according to Jason Berry.  In Regnum Christi discussion groups, followers studied Maciel's letters.

Maciel wrote extensively on the formation of priests and other matters pertaining to Church governance. His main stated purpose for the Legion of Christ was to form and motivate enterprising lay members of the Catholic Church to take an active part in the Church's mission. In particular, this initiative focused on the members of Regnum Christi, for example, through spiritual direction.

Through the Legion of Christ and the Regnum Christi, Maciel started many schools, a network of universities, and numerous charitable institutes.

Earlier relations with the Vatican

Until his misdeeds became public, Maciel was well-regarded at the Vatican. He accompanied Pope John Paul II on his visits to Mexico in 1979, 1990, and 1993, and was  appointed by the Pope to the Ordinary Assembly of the Synod of Bishops on the Formation of Priests in Circumstances of the Present Day (1990). He was a member of the Interdicasterial Commission for a Just Distribution of Clergy (1991), the IV General Conference of Latin American Bishops (CELAM) (1992), the Ordinary Assembly of the Synod of Bishops on the Consecrated Life and Its Role in the Church and in the World (1994), the Synod of Bishops' Special Assembly for America (1997) and (since 1994) as a permanent consultant to the Congregation for the Clergy. The golden anniversary of his priestly ordination was celebrated on 26 November 1994, with 57 Legionary priests ordained the day prior. Maciel served as Chancellor of the Pontifical Athenaeum Regina Apostolorum, which is based in Rome.

Maciel collaborated extensively with Pope John Paul II, either in person or through members of his organization, the Legion of Christ. The pope admired Maciel for strictly adhering to the magisterium and the vocations to the Legion of Christ. Maciel received many donations from Mexico's richest persons. In addition, Maciel and the Legion gave the Vatican considerable funding over many years. While many believe that Pope John Paul II was blinded by trust of Maciel, a journalist has speculated that this financial influence was the reason the Church postponed acting on allegations of sexual abuse by Maciel.

Fundraising
Jason Berry reports that early in his career, only two years into being a priest, Maciel visited the Vatican in 1946 to donate $10,000 from "several of Mexico's wealthiest families and its president, Miguel Aleman Valdes", appealing for support for scholarships for seminarians to study in Spain.

Maciel sought and received large donations from the wives of wealthy men such as Flora Barragán, "the widow of an industrialist" from Monterrey.  Barragán reportedly donated $50 million to Maciel's Legion of Christ. According to José Barba, a "Mexico City college professor and former Legion seminarian", “Maciel was 27 when he purchased the [first seminary] estate. In 1950 he began construction on the Instituto Cumbres, the first prep school, in Mexico City, the land for which Flora provided. That summer he also inaugurated Collegio Massimo in Rome. He was 30. In 1953 he tried to start construction of a college in Salamanca," but that was delayed a year.

The Garza-Sada families were another Monterrey group he received donations from. After the family patriarch, Dionisio Garza Garza, died, Maciel courted and received generous donations from his widow. According to her daughter, Roberta Garza, her mother,  “never learned about his kids. He targeted women in Mexico of a certain class who were not allowed to work. ... For cultured women who were bored, Maciel offered a sense of purpose.”  A "continuing flow of money" to Maciel's projects also came from two other children of Dionisio Garza Garza—Paulina and Luis.

Another benefactor was Josefita Pérez Jiménez, the daughter of a former Venezuelan dictator, who provided largesse for a seminary in Salamanca, Spain built in 1958 by Maciel.  Boarders at Catholic schools were also a focus. According to Roberta Garza, ”They were grooming us for Regnum Christi — the Movement. If your family had money, power, influence, they wanted you. They kept telling me, 'God gave you everything, you must give back by fighting the forces of evil.'"

The highest level of membership in Maciel's Regnum Christi group, lay celibates, "live in communities and work relentlessly on fundraising".

Sexual abuse allegations

In 1976, Juan Vaca, a former student of Maciel, who states that Maciel molested him from the age of 12 to 24, wrote a 12-page single-spaced letter to Maciel attacking him for his abuse and the "aberrant and sacrilegious abuse" of 20 other "good and gifted young boys."  Vaca's letter was included in a dossier sent by Bishop John Raymond McGann to the Vatican suggesting that it investigate the accusation.  "The letter was acknowledged; nothing happened." In 1978, when John Paul II became pope, the bishop and Vaca wrote again. "But again, nothing happened."

In 1989, Juan Vaca, tried again, sending "a long, detailed letter" to John Paul "in a dossier ... via Vatican diplomatic pouch, again including his original statement naming Maciel's victims".  He also asked for release from his vows of ordination arguing "that because of the abuse, he never should have been ordained". Several years later he was sent a document releasing him, "but on the Maciel charges—again, nothing".

On February 23, 1997, a report in The Hartford Courant "exposed a history of pedophilia" by Maciel involving nine victims who came forward to go on the record. 
The victims alleged that they had been abused as youths and young men by Maciel while studying under him in Spain and Rome in the 1940s and 1950s. The group, which included respectable academics and former priests, lodged formal charges at the Vatican in 1998. They were told the following year that the Congregation of the Doctrine of the Faith, then headed by Cardinal Joseph Ratzinger (later Pope Benedict XVI), was not moving forward with a direct prosecution. Whether Cardinal Ratzinger made this decision on his own or on orders by Pope John Paul II is not publicly known.

The Vatican refused to comment, while Maciel claimed innocence but refused to be interviewed.  The Legion set up a website accusing the nine of fomenting a "conspiracy" against Maciel. Roman Catholic luminaries in the country the allegations were made came to the defense of Maciel and the Legion: William Donohue of the Catholic League called the men's claims "balderdash";  Father Richard John Neuhaus of First Things magazine stated that the charges were false with "a moral certainty"; John Paul II biographer and NBC Vatican analyst George Weigel; William Bennett, a former Reagan Education secretary; Mary Ann Glendon, a Harvard Law professor. The allegations were ignored by John Paul II who continued his praise of Maciel.

Other illicit activities

Drug addiction
During his life, Maciel was the focus of several investigations of his behaviour. There were allegations of drug abuse, for which he was investigated in 1956; he was hospitalized for morphine addiction. He was also investigated for allegedly sexually abusing children. But there was no public notice of his suspension, and he was nonetheless returned as head of the Congregation.

Mistresses and children
In July 2009, a Spanish daily published an interview with a woman who had had a child with Maciel in 1986 and was living in a luxury apartment in Madrid which Maciel had purchased for her. A day later, Mexican media reported that attorney José Bonilla would represent three of a possible total of six of Maciel's natural children in a civil lawsuit to recover Maciel's estate. The lawyer claimed that Maciel owned several properties in Mexico and around the world in his own name.  According to José Bonilla, whose son was attacked by a teacher at one of Maciel's schools, Maciel took an adoptive son and a natural son—Omar and Raúl—on trips to Europe, using an assumed name of "Raúl Rivas". From the ages of 8 and 14 they were molested by him, but "as teenagers they began pushing him off".

In February 2009, news broke that Maciel had led a double life. Álvaro Corcuera, the General Director, visited each of the Legionary Territories and publicly apologized for Maciel's behaviour. Additionally, the Legion has publicly acknowledged that Maciel had fathered a daughter.  As a result of all these acknowledgements, Pope Benedict XVI personally intervened and initiated a formal Vatican visitation of all legionary houses.

Plagiarism
In 1959 Maciel published a book,  (The Psalter of My Days), which was widely read among members of the Legion and partially translated into English. It was a memoir of experiences of persecution.

Although the Legion's memorandum described Maciel's book as "a slight rewriting", a Spanish legionary familiar with it stated that it copied Lucia's memoir "80 percent in style and content."

Lucia's memoir was titled  (The Psalter of My Hours). He completed it in 1941 while a political prisoner of the Francoist Spanish State; it was published posthumously in Spain in 1956; that edition is believed to have been used by Maciel as the basis of his own book.

Forced retirement

In January 2005, Maciel was required to step down as head of the order. A few days before John Paul II died, Cardinal Ratzinger announced his intention of removing "filth" from the Church; many believed he was referring specifically to Maciel. After Ratzinger re-opened an investigation, the Vatican requested that Maciel withdraw from active ministry. In January 2006, Maciel stepped down as head of the Legion of Christ and tendered its leadership to long-time follower Álvaro Corcuera. In May 2006, Ratzinger, now as Pope Benedict XVI, disciplined him: the Congregation for the Doctrine of the Faith ordered Maciel to live "a reserved life of penitence and prayer, relinquishing any form of public ministry", and published a press communique to that effect. A canonical trial was however ruled out, officially because of his advanced age and poor health,  and Maciel was never defrocked.

In 2007, the order was told to cancel the vows of its members to never criticize their superiors, and to inform on any dissent within the order. Maciel moved from Rome to a house he shared with other priests in Jacksonville, Florida, where he died on January 30, 2008, at age 87. He had a private funeral and was buried in his birthplace, Cotija, Michoacán.

Maciel never made any apologies, and continued to deny the allegations. Corcuera apologized to the victims both for Maciel's actions and the inaction of others.

In December 2019, the organization accepted responsibility for 175 cases of child sexual abuse by 33 priests, including 60 minors who were abused by Maciel. Former Vatican Secretary of State Angelo Sodano was accused of leading the effort to shield Maciel and other sexually abusive Legion of Christ clergy.

Later relations with the Vatican
Investigative journalist Jason Berry wrote in an April 2010 article in the National Catholic Reporter that the "charismatic" founder of the Legion of Christ "sent streams of money to Roman curia officials with a calculated end. Maciel was buying support for his group and defence for himself, should his secret life become known." Based on "former Legion insiders", Berry reports of large donations, "always in cash", (and so more subject to abuse). "Fine wines and $1,000 Spanish hams" were delivered "to favored officials". "Pivotal supporter" Cardinal Angelo Sodano benefited from  banquets for 200 members of his extended family when he became cardinal and again when he became secretary of State, and  $5,000, $10,000 for fees when he gave speeches to the Legion.  Stanisław Dziwisz, the "gatekeeper of attendance" to private papal masses, normally admitted "only a few world leaders" but allowed a family from Mexico to attend when they gave him $50,000. Maciel also "sent $1 million via Dziwisz in advance of a papal trip to Poland."

Berry and his late colleague Gerald Renner wrote the 2004 book Vows of Silence: The Abuse of Power in the Papacy of John Paul II, and the related TV documentary Vows of Silence on Maciel and the Legion of Christ. According to Berry, Maciel's key supporters, who provided him with a protective shield, included Cardinal Angelo Sodano, Vatican secretary of state from 1991 to 2006, under both popes John Paul II and Benedict XVI; Cardinal Eduardo Martínez Somalo, prefect of the Congregation for Institutes of Consecrated Life and Societies of Apostolic Life; and Cardinal Stanislaw Dziwisz, the Polish secretary of John Paul II (1978–2005).

The New York Times reported claims that even under Cardinal Joseph Ratzinger, who took an immediate interest in the case, the investigation into Maciel remained stalled. "Other factors delayed a reckoning. Some questioned the accounts of abuse; one of the original nine complainants recanted."

Denunciation by the Church
In March 2009, Pope Benedict XVI ordered an apostolic visitation of the Legionaries of Christ. Five bishops from five different countries, working independently of each other, conducted an extensive investigation which took them to nearly every one of the religious order's houses and on March 15, 2010, submitted their report to the Vatican. On March 25, 2010, the Legion of Christ and the Regnum Christ issued a joint statement acknowledging Maciel's history of sex abuse and apologized.

On May 1, 2010, after a two-day meeting in Rome with the bishops, the Vatican issued a statement on the report and announced that the Pope would name a delegate to the Legion and a visitator to Regnum Christi, because the "conduct of [Maciel] has given rise to serious consequences in the life and structure of the Legion, such as to require a process of profound re-evaluation." In its statement the Vatican denounced Maciel for having created a system of power that enabled him to lead an "immoral" double life "devoid of scruples and authentic religious meaning." The Vatican statement was unusually explicit in its denunciation of Maciel's crimes and deception.

The "very serious and objectively immoral acts" of Maciel, which were "confirmed by incontrovertible testimonies", represented "true crimes and manifest a life without scruples or authentic religious sentiment", the Vatican said. The Vatican also stated that the Legion created a "mechanism of defense" around Maciel to shield him from accusations and suppress damaging witnesses from reporting abuse. "It made him untouchable", the Vatican said. The statement decried the "lamentable disgracing and expulsion of those who doubted" Maciel's virtue. The Vatican statement did not address whether the Legion's leadership would face any sanctions. The Vatican acknowledged the "hardships" faced by Maciel's accusers through the years when they were ostracized or ridiculed, and commended their "courage and perseverance to demand the truth."

Notes

References
 ACI Prensa. 2009 December 11. Legión de Cristo da a conocer a sus miembros plagio de P. Maciel en libro espiritual (Legion of Christ announces to its members plagiarism of Father Maciel in a spiritual work).
Associated Press. 2006 October 16. Pope Benedict bestows sainthood in ceremony.
Berry, Jason. Money paved way for Maciel's influence in the Vatican (First of Two Parts). National Catholic Reporter, Apr. 06, 2010
Berry, Jason. How Fr. Maciel built his empire (Second of Two Parts). National Catholic Reporter, Apr. 12, 2010
Berry, Jason, and Renner, Gerald. 2004. Vows of Silence: The Abuse of Power in the Papacy of John Paul II. Free Press. 
Vows of Silence, a one-hour documentary on Father Maciel and the Legion of Christ
Catholic News Agency. 2009 February 3. Legionaries of Christ acknowledge founder's 'inappropriate' behavior.
Catholic News Agency. 2009 March 31. Pope initiates Apostolic Visitation of the Legion of Christ.
Conde, Angeles, and Murray, David. 2005. The Legion of Christ: A History. Circle Press. 
 La Jornada (Mexico). 2009 August 11. Reclaman derechos hereditarios tres hijos más de Marcial Maciel (Three more children of Marcial Maciel demand there inheritance).
Los Angeles Times. 2008 February 1. Catholic order's founder was rebuked for sex abuse.
Maciel, Marcial. 2003. Christ is My Life. Circle Press. 
 Milenio 2009 August 11 Tres hijos de Maciel pelearán sus bienes.
 El Mundo (Madrid). 2009-12-12. Maciel plagió el libro de cabecera de los Legionarios.
 Periodista Digital (Madrid). 2009 August 9. La hija del pecador Legionario de Cristo.
Telegraph (UK). 2008 February 2. Obituary of the Reverend Marcial Maciel
Thompson, Damian. 2009 February 4. Legionaries of Christ face disaster after founder's double life is exposed

External links 

Legionaries of Christ
National Catholic Reporter article on his faculties being restricted
Regnum Christi

1920 births
2008 deaths
People from Cotija de la Paz
Catholic Church sexual abuse scandals in Latin America
Founders of Catholic religious communities
Legionaries of Christ
Mexican spiritual writers
Burials in Michoacán
Regnum Christi
Scandals in Mexico
Catholic priests convicted of child sexual abuse
20th-century Mexican Roman Catholic priests
People named in the Paradise Papers